Transcobalamins are carrier proteins which bind cobalamin (B12).

Types
 Transcobalamin I (TCN1), also known as haptocorrin, R-factor, and R-protein, is a glycoprotein produced by the salivary glands of the mouth. It primarily serves to protect cobalamin (Vitamin B12) from acid degradation in the stomach by producing a Haptocorrin-Vitamin B12 complex. Once the complex has traveled to the more neutral duodenum, pancreatic proteases degrade haptocorrin, releasing free cobalamin, which now binds to intrinsic factor for absorption by ileal enterocytes.
 Transcobalamin II (TCN2) binds cobalamin once it has been taken up by enterocytes of the terminal ileum and the "Intrinsic Factor-Vitamin B12" complex has been degraded. Transcobalamin II is then involved with the transport of Vitamin B12 to the tissues.

References

External links